Chlorophenol red is an indicator dye that changes color from yellow to violet in the pH range 4.8 to 6.7. The pH of a substance is determined by taking the negative logarithm of the Hydronium ion concentration and the indictor changes color due to the dissociation of H+ ions. The lambda max is at 572 nm.

Properties and Uses of Chlorophenol Red 
The dissociation mechanism of Chlorophenol Red is similar to that of phenolphthalein meaning it can be used as a color indicator. The dissociation of hydroxyl and hydrogen atoms creates the dissociate scheme of chlorophenol red to change color from yellow to red. The pH properties of chlorophenol red are used to selectively determine the amount of chlorine dioxide in drinking water. Chlorophenol red selectively reacts with 0.1-1.9 mg l^-1 chlorine dioxide at pH 7.  The electrochemical properties of Chlorophenol red allows it to be a chromogenic label and can undergo oxidation creating several phenolic intermediates. The bacterial hydrolysis of a chlorophenol red labelled substrate produces chlorine retaining intermediates on electrodes.

References

Triarylmethane dyes
PH indicators
Redox indicators
Chloroarenes
Benzoxathioles
Phenol dyes